Kenneth Wayne Singleton (born June 10, 1947) is an American former professional baseball player and television sports commentator. He also played for the New York Mets and the Montreal Expos. In 1982, Singleton was named the recipient of the prestigious Roberto Clemente Award and in 1986, he was inducted into the Baltimore Orioles Hall of Fame.

Baseball career

Born in Manhattan, New York City, and raised in nearby Mount Vernon, Singleton played both baseball and basketball in high school. He also played baseball in the Bronx Federation League at Macombs Dam Park, across the street from Yankee Stadium. Singleton was drafted out of Hofstra University by the New York Mets as the third overall pick in the 1st round of the 1967 Major League Baseball draft. He made his major league debut with the Mets on June 24, 1970 at the age of 23. On April 5, 1972, he was part of a package deal when traded to the Montreal Expos with infielders Tim Foli and Mike Jorgensen for Rusty Staub.

Singleton's best year of the three in Montreal was 1973, when he led the league in on-base percentage (one of nine top-ten finishes in that category over the course of his career) and collected 23 home runs, 103 RBIs and a .302 batting average (his first .300 season).

Singleton was acquired along with Mike Torrez by the Orioles from the Expos for Dave McNally, Rich Coggins and minor-league right-handed pitcher Bill Kirkpatrick at the Winter Meetings on December 4, 1974. During his ten years in Baltimore, Singleton played the best baseball of his career as the Orioles won two pennants, in 1979 and 1983, and won the 1983 World Series. In 1977, he posted a career-high .328 batting average, third highest in the American League. In 1979 he had one of his best seasons with career-highs of 35 home runs and 111 RBIs and, he finished second to Don Baylor in voting for the American League Most Valuable Player Award. Singleton would accumulate 1,455 hits as an Oriole.

He was described by his manager with the Orioles Earl Weaver as "the kind of hitter who can start a rally by getting on base or end one by driving in the winning run." Being a slow runner was the only deficiency he had as a ballplayer. Singleton played in his final major league game on September 25, 1984, at the age of 37. The Orioles elected not to renew the option year on his contract three days later on September 28.

Career statistics
In a 15-year major league career, Singleton played in 2,082 games, accumulating 2,029 hits in 7,189 at bats for a .282 career batting average along with 246 home runs, 1,065 runs batted in and an on-base percentage of .388. He had a career .980 fielding percentage. Singleton ranks among the Orioles all-time leaders in numerous offensive statistics. In his 10 years as an Oriole, he hit .290 or better in 5 of those years. An All-Star in 1977, 1979 and 1981, he won the Roberto Clemente Award in 1982. His highest finish in the Most Valuable Player Award balloting was in 1979, when he finished second to Don Baylor. He was third in 1977, behind Al Cowens and the winner, Rod Carew.

Broadcasting career

After retiring as a baseball player, Singleton began his broadcasting career as a sportscaster for WJZ-TV in Baltimore in the mid-1980s and TSN in Canada, first as a color commentator on telecasts for the Toronto Blue Jays (1985 and 1986) and then as a television color commentator and as a radio play-by-play and color commentator for the Montreal Expos (1987–1996).

From 1997-2021, Singleton was a commentator for the New York Yankees on the YES Network and PIX 11, serving as both a color commentator and play-by-play announcer, along with partner and play-by-play announcer Michael Kay. He also worked as an announcer for Yankee games on the MSG Network, before the inception of YES and joined the Yankees broadcasting team in 1997.

His trademark calls include "This one is gone" for a home run and "Look out!" for a hard hit foul ball into the crowd or dugout, or when a pitch comes close to/hits a batter. He will also occasionally call a pitch a "chuck and duck" for a ball hit right back toward the pitcher. He also calls a pitch down the heart of the plate a "cookie".

On March 12, 2018, Singleton initially announced that he would be retiring from the broadcasting booth after the 2018 season. However, on August 9, 2018, he announced that he had decided to postpone his retirement until after the 2019 season instead. During the Yankees-Rays broadcast on YES on September 25, 2019, Singleton announced he would be returning to the Yankees booth for the 2020 season. According to the New York Post, Singleton announced that he would be retiring after the 2021 season. On October 2, 2021 during the penultimate game of the regular season, he officially announced his retirement on air to take effect the following day.

Personal life
Singleton is a cousin of former NBA player and current Philadelphia 76ers head coach Glenn "Doc" Rivers, and the father of former minor league outfielder Justin Singleton.

Singleton grew up in a house in Mount Vernon, New York, once owned by the family of former Brooklyn Dodger Ralph Branca. According to broadcast references, Singleton still resides in the Baltimore area.

Singleton sits on the Board of Directors for the Cool Kids Campaign, a non-profit organization based in Towson, Maryland. One of Singleton's roles on the Board of Directors is to host the Celebrity Golf Tournament each June.

In the 1986 edition of the Bill James Historical Baseball Abstract, James' wife Susan McCarthy picked Ken Singleton as one of the best-looking players in the 1970s. In a subsequent edition, James wrote that, upon reading the entry, Singleton sent her a thank-you card.

See also

 List of Major League Baseball career home run leaders
 List of Major League Baseball career hits leaders
 List of Major League Baseball career runs batted in leaders

References

External links

1947 births
Living people
African-American baseball players
American expatriate baseball players in Canada
American League All-Stars
Baltimore Orioles players
Hofstra Pride baseball players
Jacksonville Suns players
Major League Baseball right fielders
Montreal Expos announcers
Montreal Expos players
New York Mets players
New York Yankees announcers
Sportspeople from Manhattan
Baseball players from New York City
Sportspeople from Mount Vernon, New York
Toronto Blue Jays announcers
YES Network
Florida Instructional League Mets players
Memphis Blues players
Raleigh-Durham Mets players
Tidewater Tides players
Visalia Mets players
Winter Haven Mets players
21st-century African-American people
20th-century African-American sportspeople
Mount Vernon High School (New York) alumni